Mohammad Asghar (born 28 December 1998) is a Pakistani first-class cricketer, who plays as a slow left-arm orthodox bowler. He is from Chaman, Pakistan. He plays for United Bank Limited cricket team in the first-class arena, and plays for Quetta Gladiators in the Pakistan Super League. In December 2016, he was added to Pakistan's Test squad for their series against Australia. In March 2017, he was named in Pakistan's One Day International (ODI) squad for their series against the West Indies.

In April 2018, he was named in Sindh's squad for the 2018 Pakistan Cup. In December 2018, he was named in Pakistan's team for the 2018 ACC Emerging Teams Asia Cup. In March 2019, he was named in Punjab's squad for the 2019 Pakistan Cup.

In September 2019, he was named in Balochistan's squad for the 2019–20 Quaid-e-Azam Trophy tournament.

References

1998 births
Living people
Pakistani cricketers
Peshawar Zalmi cricketers
Quetta Gladiators cricketers
Pashtun people
National Bank of Pakistan cricketers
Peshawar cricketers
Balochistan cricketers
Cricketers from Peshawar
Khulna Tigers cricketers